Rev. Fr. Andrew Campbell (born March 27, 1946) is an Irish-Ghanaian catholic missionary, founder of Lepers Aid Committee and parish priest of  Christ the King Catholic church in Accra.

Early life 
Born on the 27th day of March 1946 in Dublin, Ireland, he had his early education at Sisters of Charity school and de la Salle Primary School in Ireland. In October 1970, he obtain a Bachelor of Divinity from St. Patrick's College.

Priesthood and work 
Andrew was ordained as a catholic priest in December 1970,  he was posted to Ghana as a missionary priest under The Society of the Divine Word a year after. He has served in many catholic Parishes in Accra, including, Holy Spirit Cathedral, Adabraka, St, Peter's Parish, Osu, Sacred Heart Parish Accra, where he established the Sacred Heart Vocational Institute.

Lepers Aid Committee 
He founded the Lepers Aid committee in 1993 to care for persons with leprosy. The NGO has established and run leprosarium in Weija, Ho, Nkanchina and Kokofu.

CTK Soup Kitchen 
The Christ The King Soup Kitchen is another initiative of Andrew  to provide food and help to less privileged persons on the street, those who are homeless and then less privileged persons in society.

Ghanaian Citizenship 
In 2013, Andrews Campbell acquired Ghanaian citizenship. He also acquired Nii Lantey as his local name.

Recognition and Awards 
He has received several honors due to his humanitarian activities.

See also 

 Charles G. Palmer-Buckle
 Peter Turkson

References 

Living people
1946 births
Ghanaian Roman Catholics
Ghanaian Christian missionaries
Irish Christian missionaries
Alumni of St Patrick's College, Maynooth
Ghanaian philanthropists